John Otoo is an Anglican bishop in Ghana: he has been Bishop of Sekondi from 2006 to 2016.

References

Anglican bishops of Sekondi
21st-century Anglican bishops in Ghana
Anglican archdeacons in Africa